Dresvishche is a rural locality (a village) in Vokhtozhskoye Rural Settlement, Gryazovetsky District, Vologda Oblast, Russia. The population was 102 as of 2002.

Geography 
Tarasovo is the nearest rural locality.

References 

Rural localities in Gryazovetsky District